Django and Jimmie is the sixth and final collaborative studio album by American country music artists Willie Nelson and Merle Haggard. It was released on June 2, 2015, by Legacy Recordings. The album was Haggard's final studio album prior to his death in April 2016. Merle Haggard died of Pneumonia 10 months after its release.

The album was well received by the critics, while it topped Billboard's Top Country Albums and reached number seven on the Billboard 200 upon its release.

Overview
Django and Jimmie marked Willie Nelson and Merle Haggard's  sixth album collaboration. Nelson announced its completion during an appearance on Jimmy Kimmel Live! at South by Southwest festival on March 20, 2015. The release of the first single, "It's All Going to Pot" was set for April 20 (420 day).

Produced by Buddy Cannon, the album features fourteen tracks by Nelson and Haggard. The song "Django and Jimmie" is a tribute to musicians Django Reinhardt and Jimmie Rodgers. Cannon forwarded the title-track to Haggard and Nelson separately. Both were interested by the song, and had talked in previous years about recording a new collaboration album. The preproduction of the album took eighteen months. The parties involved discussed the type of material they wanted to include in the album and co-wrote some of the songs by talking on the telephone. The entire album was recorded in three days. It features a guest appearance by Bobby Bare on the tribute song "Missing Ol' Johnny Cash". The release of the album was announced for June 2, 2015.

Reception

Critical

The album garnered positive reviews. With 73 points out of 100, the aggregate score website Metacritic classified them as "Generally favorable reviews". Rolling Stone rated the release with three stars out of five. The magazine called it a "grab bag" new and older material that relied on Nelson and Haggard's "mythology". Uncut delivered a favorable review, declaring: "Nelson sings like a canary and plays like a dream, Haggard growls like a grizzled jailbird and everyone seems to be having a blast". American Songwriter favored the chemistry between Nelson and Haggard, while it praised Cannon and his  "rootsy, loose and homey" approach, while it called the backing band "great". Paste delivered a positive review, declaring: "Just hearing (Haggard and Nelson) make the music they want is plenty".

Austin Chronicle rated the album with four stars out of five. The review remarked the merger of the styles of both artists:  Haggard's signature use of the Telecaster and steel guitar; with Nelson's guitar and Mickey Raphael's harmonica. It called the rasp on their voices "well seasoned", while it concluded that both "deliver a master class on how country music is supposed to be done". Los Angeles Times wrote a favorable review, that considered "the spirit in (Haggard and Nelson's) voices" the main feature of the album. The Wall Street Journal called it "one of the strongest, most engaging country albums of 2015" and remarked "its fresh, revealing songs, striking harmonies and varying rhythms". On its review, The New Yorker talked about the situation of Country music. The magazine opined that the album was "outlier in a genre that is increasingly fixated on youth", and discussed the disappearance of adult themes and aging in the genre.

Allmusic gave the album three-and-a-half stars out of five. It praised Cannon's "sharp ear for material, along with a way with a relaxed groove", while it considered Haggard and Nelson "filled with good humor (and) a delicate balance of fun and sweet".

Commercial

Upon its release, Django and Jimmie sold 31,000 units. It topped Billboard's Top Country Albums; and reached number seven on the Billboard 200, becoming Nelson's fourth top ten album on the chart and Haggard's first.  The album has sold 148,000 copies in the US as of May 2016.

Track listing

Personnel

 Bobby Bare - vocals on "Missing Ol' Johnny Cash"
 Eddie Bayers - drums
 Eli Beaird - bass guitar
 Larry Beaird - acoustic guitar
 Wyatt Beard - background vocals
 Jim "Moose" Brown - piano
 Shawn Camp - acoustic guitar
 Melonie Cannon - background vocals
 Renato Caranto - saxophone
 Tony Creasman - drums
 Dan Dugmore - steel guitar
 Kevin "Swine" Grantt - bass guitar, upright bass
 Ben Haggard - electric guitar
 Merle Haggard - lead vocals
 Tony Harrell - keyboards
 Jamey Johnson - vocals on "It's All Going to Pot"
 Mike Johnson - acoustic slide guitar, Dobro, steel guitar
 Alison Krauss - background vocals
 Liana Manis - background vocals
 Catherine Styron Marx - Hammond B-3 organ, piano
 Willie Nelson - Trigger, lead vocals
 Mickey Raphael - harmonica
 Bobby Terry - acoustic guitar, electric guitar
 Lonnie Wilson - drums

Charts

Weekly charts

Year-end charts

References

2015 albums
Willie Nelson albums
Merle Haggard albums
Collaborative albums
Legacy Recordings albums
Albums produced by Buddy Cannon